Ryom Tae-ok (born February 2, 1999) is a North Korean pair skater. With her skating partner, Kim Ju-sik, she is the 2018 Four Continents bronze medalist, the 2017 Asian Winter Games bronze medalist, 2016 Cup of Tyrol bronze medalist, and 2016 Asian Open Trophy champion.

Ryom and Kim were the first North Korean figure skaters to win a medal at an ISU event.

Kim Hyon-son coaches the pair in Pyongyang.

Programs 
(with Kim Ju-sik)

Competitive highlights 
GP: Grand Prix; CS: Challenger Series

With Kim Ju-sik

With Kim Mun-song

With O Chang-gon

Detailed results

With Kim Ju-sik 

Small medals for short and free programs awarded only at ISU Championships.

ISU Personal best highlighted in bold.

References

External links 
 
 Confession of Gold Medallists at The Pyongyang Times

1999 births
Figure skaters at the 2017 Asian Winter Games
Medalists at the 2017 Asian Winter Games
Asian Games bronze medalists for North Korea
North Korean female pair skaters
Living people
Sportspeople from Pyongyang
Figure skaters at the 2018 Winter Olympics
Olympic figure skaters of North Korea
Asian Games medalists in figure skating
Four Continents Figure Skating Championships medalists